The Big East Conference field hockey tournament is the conference championship tournament in field hockey for the Big East Conference.  The tournament has been held every year since 1989.  It is a single-elimination tournament and seeding is based on regular season records. The winner, declared conference champion, receives the conference's automatic bid to the NCAA Division I Field Hockey Championship.

Format
The top four finishers from the conference regular season play a single-elimination tournament, held at a campus site which rotates among conference members.

Champions

By year

By school

References

Big East Conference field hockey
Field hockey
NCAA Division I field hockey conference competitions
Recurring sporting events established in 1989
1989 establishments in the United States